The Rugova war dance ( or Loja Luftarake e Rugovës) is a traditional Albanian sword dance named after the Rugova region in Kosovo.

Origin 
The Pyrrhic Dance (or Warrior Dance of Rugova) has traditionally been performed by mountain dwellers. This dance was based on the Korybantes (guards of the baby Zeus). The Korybantes prevented Cronus from finding the place where his son, Zeus, was hidden, by clashing their swords to cover the cries of the baby. Dorians took this dance to Sparta, Alexander the Great danced before attacking Persia, and Julius Caesar, after his stay in Illyria, made the dance known in Italy. The Albanologist, Thelloczi, asserts that Illyrians danced with swords in their hands as Albanians do today. 
Women dance with handkerchieves. There is also a combined dance in which women and men dance together.

Description 
Rugova dance is considered a relic of the war dances, the remnants of pantomimic dances performed in the re-enactment or preparation of battles.
The dance is performed by two male dancers who fight a mock battle for the hand of a girl (a "maiden's dance"). 

It was made internationally famous by the Kosovo Albanian Rugova clans (hailing from Kelmend in Albania). The dance is also found in mountainous Montenegro, where a tribe of shepherds settled in the 18th century. Based on the war dance of the Rugova clans, Slavko Kvasnevski created in 1971 the Rugova choreography, which was part of Yugoslav folk dancing ensemble. In 1982, it was noted that "in the last time the Rugova dance has gained wide popularity".

See also 
Albanian tribes

Annotations

References 

Albanian culture
Albanian folk dances
Balkan music